James Schraefel (born August 23, 1948) is a Canadian former professional ice hockey player.

During the 1973–74 season, Schraefel played 34 games in the World Hockey Association with the Edmonton Oilers.

References

External links

1948 births
Living people
Canadian ice hockey centres
Edmonton Oil Kings (WCHL) players
Edmonton Oilers (WHA) players
Fort Worth Wings players
San Diego Gulls (WHL) players
Tidewater Wings players